In Greek mythology, Rhexenor ( means "breaking armed ranks") may refer to the following figures:

 Rhexenor, a Phaeacian prince as son of King Nausithous and the brother of Alcinous who married his daughter Arete. Apollo killed Rhexenor in his hall while he was still a bridegroom and with no son.
Rhexenor, the father of Chalciope, who was the second wife of King Aegeus of Athens.
 Rhexenor, one of Diomedes' followers who, returning from the Trojan War, were transformed into swan-like birds.

Notes

References 

 Apollodorus, The Library with an English Translation by Sir James George Frazer, F.B.A., F.R.S. in 2 Volumes, Cambridge, MA, Harvard University Press; London, William Heinemann Ltd. 1921. ISBN 0-674-99135-4. Online version at the Perseus Digital Library. Greek text available from the same website.
Homer, The Odyssey with an English Translation by A.T. Murray, Ph.D. in two volumes. Cambridge, MA., Harvard University Press; London, William Heinemann, Ltd. 1919. . Online version at the Perseus Digital Library. Greek text available from the same website.
 Parada, Carlos, Genealogical Guide to Greek Mythology, Jonsered, Paul Åströms Förlag, 1993. .
Publius Ovidius Naso, Metamorphoses translated by Brookes More (1859-1942). Boston, Cornhill Publishing Co. 1922. Online version at the Perseus Digital Library.
Publius Ovidius Naso, Metamorphoses. Hugo Magnus. Gotha (Germany). Friedr. Andr. Perthes. 1892. Latin text available at the Perseus Digital Library.
 Smith, William; Dictionary of Greek and Roman Biography and Mythology, London (1873). Online version at the Perseus Digital Library
 Tripp, Edward, Crowell's Handbook of Classical Mythology, Thomas Y. Crowell Co; First edition (June 1970). .

Princes in Greek mythology
Achaeans (Homer)
People of the Trojan War
Metamorphoses into birds in Greek mythology
Metamorphoses characters
Attican characters in Greek mythology
Phaeacians in Greek mythology